The Commandery is a historic building open to visitors and located in the city of Worcester, England. It opened as a museum in 1977 and was for a while the only museum in England dedicated solely to the Civil Wars. The Commandery ceased to be a Civil War museum when it reopened to the public in May 2007, having undergone a year and a half of refurbishments and reinterpretation jointly funded by the Heritage Lottery Fund and Worcester City Council, who own the building. It is a Grade I listed building.

History

The Commandery has been used for many different purposes over the many years it has been around. These include: a church, a house, a monastic hospital, hotel, and a museum open to the public.

Present exhibits
In its current form, it displays  six different periods of history, focusing on the characters and stories that affected The Commandery itself at those times.
The periods covered are as follows:
 The Medieval period, when the Commandery is said to have been founded (possibly 1085, though it may have been up to two centuries later). It served as an almshouse as well as a place of hospitality for pilgrims and other travellers and was most probably founded by the Order of St John of Jerusalem, the Knights Hospitaller, who named their administrative areas commanderies.
 The Tudor period, when following the suppression in 1540 the Commandery became the residence of the Wyldes, a family of clothiers who remained in possession of it until 1785.
 The Civil War, when the Commandery was used by Charles II's forces as headquarters during the Battle of Worcester.
 The Georgian period, when after its sale by Thomas Wylde in 1785 the Commandery was split into several family homes.
 The Victorian period, when the Commandery housed a pioneering school for the "blind sons of gentlemen".
 The 1950s, when the Commandery was used as a printing factory by the Littlebury family.

The Commandery includes multimedia exhibits, interactive displays and children's activities.

Foundation 
Tradition would suggest that the first building on the Commandery site was constructed in the 11th century on the orders of Wulfstan, Bishop of Worcester (later Saint Wulfstan), as a hospital or almshouse (today a hospice) for the terminally ill and the destitute and pilgrims. Medieval pictures believed to have been made about 1490 were found in 1935 in what may have been a specially painted chamber for the dying, the pictures showing the life to come.

The first written record of its existence does not occur until the 13th century, in 1240 in "The Miracles of St. Wulfstan". This collection of stories refers to a Thomas of Eldersfield who was blinded and castrated after losing a judicial duel. According to the story Thomas was cared for at the Hospital of St. Wulfstan by Ysabel [sic] a lay sister that took pity on him. Thomas went on to make a miraculous recovery, having both his sight and manhood restored by a miracle of St. Wulfstan. The basic facts of this story appear to be true, as the legal case definitely went before the royal justices in 1221. This would suggest that the hospital was certainly in existence at that point and is nearer the dating of the buildings.

Another theory suggests that the hospital was built to mark the canonisation of St. Wulfstan which occurred in 1203. As this date is closer to the first written record of the hospital's existence it is perhaps more likely, however the fact that a chapel incorporated into the site was dedicated to St. Godwald and not St. Wulfstan might suggest that the institution was in fact already in existence in 1203 and rather renamed to mark the canonisation of St. Wulfstan.

The name the Commandery suggests the original foundation was instituted possibly by the Knights Hospitaller of the order of St John of Jerusalem in England whose administrative districts, often based just outside city walls, were called commanderies and keep that name today. An example where the chapel has survived but the other buildings have disappeared can be found at Poznan, Poland. The name commandery for their administrative districts remains in use today by the Venerable Order of St John. Alternatively it may have been founded by the Knights Templar. In 1312 by papal decree, the property of the Templars was transferred to the Order of Hospitallers, which also absorbed many of the Templars' members. In effect, the dissolution of the Templars could be seen as the merger of the two rival orders.

Whatever the case may be, and it is likely that we will never know, the foundation of the Commandery is certainly shrouded in mystery.

Hospital of St. Wulfstan - the medieval period at the Commandery 
What is slightly better documented than the foundation of the hospital is its charitable work. It has traditionally been suggested that the hospital was originally built mainly as a hostel for travellers arriving at Worcester during the night. At dusk the city gates would have been closed, and so this theory makes use of the Commandery's position just outside Sidbury gate. Despite little evidence to support this, it is still considered likely.

The first written evidence for the hospital's charitable work is "The Tale of Thomas of Eldersfield". Another record, of the acceptance of a benefaction from one William de Molendiniis [sic], records that in 1294 there were 22 people in the infirmary, all described as "sick". By the end of the 14th century, the hospital's work appears to have altered. Several records from the 1390s show that the hospital was granting corrodies, that is, granting people shelter and sustenance for life in return for their property (analogous to purchasing an annuity for a lump sum). Another case, from 1403, refers to Ralph and Alicia Symondes, who were granted a house and money, rather than a place in the hospital, in return for their assets. This particular example highlights that by the 15th century the Hospital of St Wulfstan had become less a charitable care home for the elderly and infirm, but rather a profitable business.

By 1441, the ethics of this practice had been called into question, and Bishop Bourchier of Worcester reformed the hospital, banning the granting of corrodies. Bourchier restricted the hospital's activities to handing out a weekly dole of bread to the poor and caring for the sick inmates. He also reorganised the hospital's management structure, appointing a master, two chaplains, five brethren and two sisters. This structure remained in place until the hospital was dissolved in 1540.

With the money received as purchase prices of corrodies, masters could become rich and therefore powerful men. Bishop Bourchier's reforms put an end to this, stripping the hospital's financial controls from the master and making it a largely honorific position given to already important people.

In the mid to late 15th century the Hospital of St Wulfstan received a large anonymous donation which was put towards a complete rebuilding of the site. The older buildings were apparently completely levelled, except for the chapel of St Godwald; and a completely new structure built in its place. The work was finished around 1460 and it is these buildings which form the core of the Commandery today.

The building was clearly divided, with the infirmary to the west and the much grander rooms for the use of the master to the east. The two sides were linked by the Great Hall, which would most likely have been used by the master for entertaining. The original ceiling, a dais and a number of walls still survive in the Great Hall. The solar room, located on the first floor of the western range, was the living quarters of the master, though it remains unclear whether this was his bedroom, living room or both.

In the eastern range, also on the first floor, is located the Commandery's "painted chamber". This room is completely covered in medieval wall paintings which date from the period of the rebuild. Their preservation is due to their Catholic nature: at the dissolution of the monasteries under Henry VIII they were painted over and protected from the damaging sun, obviously seen as popish idolatry. Most of the paintings depict scenes from the lives of saints, for example the martyrdoms of St. Erasmus and St. Thomas Beckett, and St Anne teaching the Virgin Mary to read. Other paintings include the Holy Trinity, the crucifixion of Christ and the weighing of the souls.

The name "Commandery" 
According to Nash (1784) the name the "Commandery" (pronounced Command-ery) is associated with the Knights of the Crusades. He speculates that the first known master of the Hospital of St Wulfstan, a man known only as Walter, had fought in the Crusades under the banner of either the Knights Templar or the Knights Hospitaler prior to his appointment at the hospital. Walter apparently continued to use his military title of Commander until his death c. 1290, when his successor as master also took on the title, so starting a tradition amongst masters. By association, the residence of the Commander became known as the Commandery. No better explanation than this has been presented, although no modern researches have been undertaken.

Dissolution of the Monasteries
The Hospital of St Wulfstan was suppressed in 1540, having been administered since the previous year by one Richard Morysyne [sic], a gentleman of the Royal Privy Chamber and the last master of the hospital. He seems to have been appointed specifically to wind up the affairs of the hospital. The building's wall paintings, as mentioned, were painted over and many more objects of historic and religious value were probably lost. What happened after 1540 is debated. One theory suggests that Richard Morysyne profited greatly from the hospital's dissolution, being granted it for the relatively small sum of £14. The other theory states that Morysyne surrendered the hospital, by this time known as the Commandery, to the king who then donated it to Christ Church, Oxford. In any case, by 1541 the Commandery's owner was leasing the building to one Thomas Wylde, a wealthy Worcester clothier; and in 1545 Thomas bought the Commandery outright for £498. Direct descendants, including Thomas Wylde, MP for Worcester in nine parliaments, continued to own and live in the house until Thomas Wylde of Bridgnorth (d. 25 April 1789) disposed of it in 1785.

References 
Holt, R. and Baker, N. (2004) Urban Growth and the Medieval Church: Gloucester and Worcester. Ashgate Publishing Ltd.
Nash, T. R. (1784) History of Worcestershire.
The Commandery Guide Book.

Notes

External links 
 Interior photographs
Reconstruction
Worcester City Museums: The Commandery home page

Museums established in 1977
Museums in Worcester, England
History museums in Worcestershire
Buildings and structures in Worcester, England

History of Worcester, England
Grade I listed buildings in Worcestershire